The Dutch Toggenburg goat breed was developed in the Netherlands from crosses between Dutch Landrace goats and the Toggenburg goat. It is used for the production of milk.

Sources
 Dutch Toggenburg

Goat breeds
Dairy goat breeds
Goat breeds originating in the Netherlands